Draga pri Šentrupertu ( or ) is a village northwest of Šentrupert in southeastern Slovenia. The area is part of the historical region of Lower Carniola. The Municipality of Šentrupert is now included in the Southeast Slovenia Statistical Region.

Name
The name of the settlement was changed from Draga to Draga pri Šentrupertu (literally, 'Draga near Šentrupert') in 1953. The name Draga is derived from the Slovene common noun draga 'small, narrow valley', referring to the geographical location of the settlement.

References

External links
Draga pri Šentrupertu at Geopedia

Populated places in the Municipality of Šentrupert